Konovalenko is a Ukrainian-language surname derived from the occupation of  konoval [ коновал ], an archaic term for "veterinarian", literally meaning "descendant of konoval". Notable people with this surname include:
 
Vasily Konovalenko
Viktor Konovalenko

See also
 
Konovalov, Russian surname with the same derivation
Konovalyuk
Konoval

Ukrainian-language surnames
Occupational surnames
Patronymic surnames